The Ministry of Ecological Transition (French: Ministère de la Transition écologique), commonly just referred to as Ministry of Ecology, is a department of the Government of France. It is responsible for preparing and implementing the government's policy in the fields of sustainable development, climate, energy transition and biodiversity. Barbara Pompili was appointed Minister of Ecological Transition on 6 July 2020 under Prime Minister Jean Castex.

History
On 8 January 1971, under President Georges Pompidou, the Ministry of the Environment (Ministère de l'Environnement) was created as a ministry subordinate to the Prime Minister of France. The first Minister of the Environment was Robert Poujade. From 1974 to 1977, the position was renamed Minister of Quality of Life; in 1978 it became Minister of the Environment and Way of Life. Sustainable development was added in 2002.

The ministry's administration is headquartered in Tour Sequoia in La Grande Arche of La Défense. The cabinet of the minister is within the Hôtel de Roquelaure, Boulevard Saint-Germain, Paris.

Competencies

The ministry is responsible for the country's environmental policy (preservation of biodiversity, Climate Kyoto Protocol application, environmental control of industries), transportation (air, road, railway and sea regulation departments), national parks and housing policy. The ministry distributes funds to research agencies or councils. As of 2017, the ministry is also responsible for energy policy.

Attached officeholders

Transports

The Minister delegate of Transport, currently Jean-Baptiste Djebbari, is in charge of transport policy.

Housing

The Minister delegate of Housing, currently Emmanuelle Wargon, is in charge of housing policy.

Biodiversity
The Secretary of State in charge of Biodiversity, currently Bérangère Abba, is in charge of biodiversity policy.

Subordinate agencies
 Bureau of Enquiry and Analysis for Civil Aviation Safety (BEA)
 Directorate General for Civil Aviation (DGAC)
 French Office for Biodiversity (OFC)

Former names
 1971 : Ministry of the Protection of Nature and of the Environment (Ministère de la Protection de la nature et de l'environnement)
 2007 : Ministry of Ecology and Sustainable Development (Ministère de l'Écologie et du Développement durable)
 2012 : Ministry of the Environment, Sustainable Development and Energy (Ministère de l'Écologie, du Développement durable et de l'Énergie)
 2016 : Ministry of the Environment, Energy and the Sea (Ministère de l'Environnement, de l'Énergie et de la Mer)
 2017 : Ministry of Ecological and Solidarity Transition (Ministère de la Transition écologique et solidaire)
 2020 : Ministry of Ecological Transition (Ministère de la Transition écologique)

See also
 List of ministers of the environment

Notes and references

External links
Ministère de l'Écologie, de l'Énergie, du Développement durable et de la Mer 
"Organisation Chart." 
Composition of the Government - official website 
Ministry of Country Planning and Environment  (Archive)
Ministry for Ecology, Sustainable Development and Spatial Planning (Archive) 

Environment

France
France
Transport organizations based in France